Muhadjir Effendy (born 29 July 1956) is an Indonesian politician and rector. He is the minister of education and culture of the Republic of Indonesia in the Working Cabinet. He was appointed by President Joko Widodo on 27 July 2016 replacing Anies Baswedan. Effendy was also the Rector of Muhammadiyah University of Malang in Indonesia from 2000 to 2016. In addition Muhadjir is chairman of Muhammadiyah Central Board of Education and Culture.

Personal life and career 
Muhadjir wrote his baccalaureate at IAIN Malang. He earned a degree at Malang Teachers' Training College (now State University of Malang). In 1996, he obtained a master's degree in Public administration from the Gadjah Mada University. In 2008, Effendy successfully completed his Doctoral program in military sociology from the Airlangga University. Muhadjir is currently listed as professor of Sociology Department in the State University of Malang. Since 2015 he was appointed Chairman of Central Board of Muhammadiyah and is expected to serve till 2020.

In addition, Muhadjir has also published several books such as "Bala Dewa", "As Witnessed Dahlan Young", "Masyarakat equilibrium: meniti perubahan dalam bingkai keseimbangan", "Pedagogi kemanusiaan: sebuah refleksi multidimensional" as well as "Muhammadiyah and Education in Indonesia".

Controversy

Statement on marriage 
Muhadjir becomes centre of controversy when he made a statement of a webinar that "the rich should marry the poor" and urged the Minister of Religious Affairs to declare a fatwa about it. His proposal later caused backlash among internet users and accused him of hurting the feelings of the poor citizens. He later clarify his statement and call it just an "intermezzo".

References 

1956 births
Living people
Indonesian Muslims
People from Madiun
Politicians from East Java
Gadjah Mada University alumni
Education ministers of Indonesia
Working Cabinet (Joko Widodo)
Airlangga University alumni
Onward Indonesia Cabinet